Harlem Jean-Philippe Désir (born 25 November 1959) is a French politician who served in the government of France as Secretary of State for European Affairs from 2014 to 2017. Previously he was First Secretary of the French Socialist Party. Since 2017, he has served as the OSCE Representative on Freedom of the Media.

Early life and education 
Born in Paris, Harlem Désir is the son of a Martinican father and an Alsatian mother. He grew up in a housing project in Bagneux, north of Paris.

Désir studied at the Pantheon-Sorbonne University, where he earned a license in philosophy in 1983. Also in 1983, he emerged as a leader from that year's social unrest in France and helped organize the March for Equality and Against Racism (the so-called March of the Beurs) that started in the immigrant neighborhoods outside Lyon and ended in Paris.

SOS Racism 

Harlem Désir was briefly active in the JCR, the youth organization of the Revolutionary Communist League. Désir was the first president of the French anti-racist organisation SOS Racisme between 1984 and 1992. Under his leadership, the organization grew significantly in membership and acquired significant influence in French public life. Accused of misusing public assets from 1986 to 1987, he was sentenced to an 18 months suspended sentence and a 30,000 francs fine in 1998.

Political career

Member of the European Parliament, 1999–2014 
Désir first became a Member of the European Parliament following the 1999 European elections. A member of the Progressive Alliance of Socialists and Democrats group, he was re-elected in 2004 and 2009.

In his first parliamentary term from 1999 until 2004, Désir served on the Committee on Industry, External Trade, Research and Energy. From 2004 to 2009, he was a member of the Committee on Employment and Social Affairs. In this capacity, he served as the parliament's rapporteur on the 2008 Temporary Agency Work Directive. In his last term, he joined the Committee on International Trade. He also served as deputy chairman of the Progressive Alliance of Socialists and Democrats group.

In addition to his committee assignments, Désir was a member of the parliament's delegations for relations with India (2009–2014), the United States (2002–2004) and South Africa (1999–2002). From 2002 to 2004, he also served on the parliament's delegation to the Joint Parliamentary Assembly of the Agreement between the African, Caribbean and Pacific Group of States and the European Union (ACP-EU).

Following the 2004 European elections, Désir became one of the vice-chairpersons of a newly established European Parliament Anti-Racism and Diversity Intergroup (ARDI), alongside Claude Moraes, Saïd El Khadraoui, Emine Bozkurt, Cem Özdemir and Lívia Járóka. He was also a member of the Capital Tax, Fiscal Systems and Globalisation Intergroup of the European Parliament, to whom was presented Denis Robert and Ernest Backes's book, Revelation$, in March 2001.

Désir is considered an ardent pro-European. He fought unsuccessfully in 2005 to convince the Socialist Party to back a new European constitutional treaty.

Ahead of the 2014 European elections, Désir was appointed to head the Socialist Party's list for Ile-de-France. Following his resignation from the European Parliament, he was replaced by Christine Revault d'Allonnes Bonnefoy.

Leader of the Socialist Party, 2012–2014 

In the 2011 Socialist Party presidential primary, Désir endorsed the campaign of Martine Aubry.

On 30 June 2011, he was the delegate first secretary of the Socialist Party during the Martine Aubry bid for the Socialist Party primary, who started her campaign for presidential election of 2012 on 28 June 2011. After the resignation of Aubry on 16 September 2012, he again became First Secretary of the Socialist Party by interim.

Endorsed by Martine Aubry and Prime Minister Jean-Marc Ayrault before the 2012 Party Congress, he was elected First Secretary of the party on 18 October 2012, fending off competition for the post from another veteran who has also been convicted of financial misconduct, Jean-Christophe Cambadélis. He became the first black person to lead a major European political party. At the time of his election, he had never been a minister or member of the national parliament.

Désir remained head of the party until April 2014, when he stood down after being appointed State Secretary for European Affairs. He was replaced by Jean-Christophe Cambadélis. His resignation was partly explained with his attitude during the Dibrani case.

Minister for European Affairs, 2014–2017 
On 9 April 2014, French Prime Minister Manuel Valls appointed him Secretary of State for European Affairs at the Ministry of Foreign Affairs and International Development. In February 2015, he was appointed chairman of the General Affairs Council of the Party of European Socialists, a position he held until leaving office.

Shortly after taking office, Désir and his Italian counterpart, Sandro Gozi, set out a list of priorities for the time after the 2014 European elections, saying the new European Commission should grant maximum flexibility within existing EU budget rules to countries undertaking growth-promoting investments and structural economic reforms. Désir also proposed creating a European savings plan to mobilize citizens' savings to invest in small business and priority infrastructure projects such as extending high-speed broadband and the transition to renewable energy.

On the sidelines of an informal U.N. General Assembly meeting on the rising threat of antisemitism in January 2015, Désir joined his German counterpart Michael Roth in appealing for U.N. member states to work together on an international legal framework that would make social network providers share responsibility for the use of their platforms to spread messages promoting violence; the French call for a radical shift in the way governments treat social networking companies such as Facebook and Twitter came two weeks after the Charlie Hebdo shooting in Paris.

Later career 
Désir was appointed Representative on Freedom of the Media by the Organization for Security and Co-operation in Europe for a term of three years beginning 18 July 2017.
In 2019 he caused controversy in Albania by supporting a controversial package of law changes proposed by Albania strongman Premier Edi Rama. In June 2020, Azerbaijan blocked a package of preliminary renewal mandates for all top OSCE officials, including Désir, and issued a letter of protest over Désir's pending reappointment in particular. Tajikistan subsequently joined in opposing the renewal.

In 2021, he became the Senior Vice President, Europe of the International Rescue Committee.

Personal life 
Désir is a Roman Catholic.

He married, in 1985, Marianne Sauterey, secretary of the socialist group in the National Assembly, from whom he divorced in 1988. He then had two children with the journalist Anna Angeli. daughter of Claude Angeli, leader of Le Canard enchaîné.

When he joined the government in 2014, he declared assets of 48,442 euros.

Awards 
  - Olof Palme Prize (1990)
  - Grand Cross of the Order of the Phoenix (2016)
  - Knight Commander's Cross of the Order of Merit (2018) (presented by Michael Roth).

References

External links 
 

 

1959 births
Living people
MEPs for Île-de-France 2004–2009
MEPs for Île-de-France 2009–2014
Olof Palme Prize laureates
Politicians from Paris
French whistleblowers
French people of Martiniquais descent
Socialist Party (France) MEPs
MEPs for France 1999–2004
Chairmen of the Socialist Party (France)
Knights Commander of the Order of Merit of the Federal Republic of Germany
Black French politicians